Edward Dahler Jr. (January 31, 1926 – March 16, 2012) was an American professional basketball player. Dahler was selected in the second round (14th overall) of the 1950 NBA draft by the Philadelphia Warriors after a collegiate career at Duquesne where he became the school's first ever 1,000-point scorer. He played for the Warriors in 14 total games in 1951–52.Ed Dahler averaged, 2.5 points, 1.6 rebounds, and 0.4 assists per game.

References

1926 births
2012 deaths
American men's basketball players
United States Army personnel of World War II
Basketball players from Illinois
Duquesne Dukes men's basketball players
Forwards (basketball)
People from Hillsboro, Illinois
Philadelphia Warriors draft picks
Philadelphia Warriors players